Hypermastus bulbulus is a species of sea snail, a marine gastropod mollusk in the family Eulimidae.

Distribution
This marine species is endemic to New Zealand.

References

 Warén A. & Crossland M.R. (1991) Revision of Hypermastus Pilsbry, 1899 and Turveria Berry, 1956 (Gastropoda: Prosobranchia: Eulimidae), two genera parasitic on sand dollars. Records of the Australian Museum 43(1):85-112.

External links
 To World Register of Marine Species

Eulimidae
Gastropods of New Zealand
Gastropods described in 1906